Porcelli or Porcelly is an Italian surname that may refer to
Antonio Porcelli (1800–1870), Italian painter
Daniela Porcelli (born 1961), Italian Olympic runner
Giovanni Tacci Porcelli (1863–1928), Italian Cardinal of the Roman Catholic Church 
John Porcelly (born 1967), American guitarist
Pietro Porcelli (1872–1943), Italian-Australian sculptor

See also
Porcellis
Porcel

Italian-language surnames